Hans Krister Wickman (13 April 1924 – 10 September 1993) was a Swedish politician. He served as minister for foreign affairs from 1971 to 1973. He was governor of Sveriges Riksbank from 1973 to 1976. He also served as minister of industry from 1969 to 1971.

He served as chairman of the board of the Swedish Film Institute from 1963 to 1967. At the 4th Guldbagge Awards in 1967 he won the award for Special Achievement.

References

20th-century Swedish economists
1924 births
1993 deaths
Governors of Sveriges Riksbank
Members of the Första kammaren
Swedish economists
Swedish Ministers for Foreign Affairs
Swedish Ministers for Industry